The Billboard Digital Song Sales chart is a chart that ranks the most downloaded songs in the United States. Its data is compiled by Nielsen SoundScan based on each song's weekly digital sales, which combines sales of different versions of a song by an act for a summarized figure.

Chart history

References

External links
Current Digital Song Sales chart

United States Digital Songs
2022
Number-one digital songs